Ben Franklin (1942–March 22, 2003) was mayor of the city of Nepean, Ontario from the 1978 municipal election to 1997. Nepean became part of the city of Ottawa in 2001.

He was born in Elgin, Ontario in 1942. He graduated from Carleton University with a BA in 1971 and became a high school geography teacher.  In 1973, he was elected to Nepean council.  In 1975, he ran unsuccessfully as the Liberal candidate in the riding of Carleton in the Ontario general election.  As mayor, Franklin established a "pay as you go" policy which brought the city out of debt. He retired in 1997 due to health problems. His executive assistant, Mary Pitt,  succeeded him as mayor of Nepean after running a campaign that promised to simply continue Franklin's vision.

He received an artificial heart in March 2003 but died of heart failure later that month at the age of 60.

Ben Franklin Place at Centrepointe was named after him. He was the first person to be given an honorary key to the new city of Ottawa.

References

1942 births
2003 deaths
Mayors and reeves of Nepean
Carleton University alumni
Ottawa-Carleton regional councillors
Ontario Liberal Party candidates in Ontario provincial elections